Eleonore Weisgerber (born August 18, 1947) is a German television actress. She established a foundation to help research for the treatment of bipolar disorder.

Life and career
During a 2013 interview with Die Welt for the article, "Wenn große TV-Stars in die Altersarmut rutschen" ("When big TV stars slip into old age poverty"), she announced that she was involved in litigation regarding her actor's pension. Stating that she had been "bitterly disappointed" to learn how small her pension would be when she reached retirement age, she criticized the system's unfairness, noting that German television actors had historically been credited only for their days of filming when, in reality, they were expected to perform five days of related work, learning lines and developing their roles, participating costume and mask rehearsals, providing dubbing, and making media relations appearances, as well as filming.

During the spring of 2018, Weisgerber was involved in filming the NDR television film, Armer Irrer (Poor Irrer).

Filmography
(selection)

Derrick - Season 2, Episode 2 "Tod am Bahngleis" (1975, TV)
 (1999, TV film)
Inspektor Rolle (2002–2004, TV series)
Ninja Assassin (2009), as Mrs. Sabatin
Gravity (2009)
Hut in the Woods (2011)

References

External links

Charade Agency Berlin 

1948 births
German television actresses
Living people
People from Wiesbaden
German film actresses
German women singers
20th-century German actresses
21st-century German actresses
20th-century German women singers
21st-century German women singers
People with bipolar disorder